John Gleason may refer to:
 John J. Gleason, American politician in Michigan 
 John S. Gleason Jr., American banker and government administrator
 Jackie Gleason (John Herbert Gleason), American actor, comedian and writer

See also
 John Gleeson (disambiguation)